A Builder or building Broker is a person or business that arranges quotations for building plans by contractors in Australia.

The agent or business needs qualifications in the building industry and must understand the "Standards Australia" building contracts. As there is no independent watch dog it is vital to request evidence of their qualifications to advise before engaging a broker. The Building Broker can specialise in either all, or one of, the building types: residential, commercial or industrial.

Origin 
The term originally referred to a person responsible for brokering the construction of a building on real estate. While this is closely related to the work of Estate Agents, greater knowledge of the building process is essential. The job of the Building Broker is to know the construction method of the proposed design along with the current economic pricing structure of that type of construction and local factors that either increase or decrease the value of the construction. Without suitable qualifications you are essentially asking someone to negotiate for you on a subject in which they are not an expert, with the inevitable problems that will entail. Their employees should also be suitably qualified to assist as a broker is also required to know the current and projected economic factors for the local areas.

Regulation 
Within the states of Australia, Builder Brokers have no specific authority to report to or obtain specific licences. The Australian Competition and Consumer Commission (ACCC) is the body which regulates all registered companies and associations. It is highly recommended to confirm that your building broker is suitably qualified as it is common for sales people to start a brokerage with very little building knowledge. It would be like going to a witch doctor for medical advice to choose a building broker who isn't actually a suitably qualified building professional, preferably a registered builder.

Industrial Structure 
Within Australia there is only a handful of national brokering firms in existence, such as Home Builders Advantage Australia's Biggest Building broker, Australian Home Renovations, Home Builders Australia, Placeme and Clear Build, with most being regional or area specialists. Only a handful of brokerage firms handle commercial and residential quoting services with Place me and Home Builders Australia being the oldest. Specialists exist in each state or major city and can often be more competitive, with their local knowledge of the industry.

The Building Broker services typically include everything from the initial site survey to creation of the home design; then qualifying builders and managing the tender process to ensure client satisfaction. Typically, savings can be achieved in excess of 10% when compared to the traditional method of purchasing a new home by way of display homes. Clear Build, as an example, does not draw its own plans, but utilizes the customers plans, forcing builders into a competitive environment to ensure your plans are priced fairly, with significant savings possible. it is wise to select the building broker that has full time staff to assist with all phases of the project from design until completion. Too many contractors involved will only add to your overall costs and will become an issue should problems occur with no central point of redress.  

Placeme differs from the standard procedure, and provides the tools that the builder brokers use to facilitate the brokering process nationally in Australia, as well as providing the Builder Brokering service on their website.

Fees 
Brokerage fees are typically found to be charged to the contractor to whom the work is being contracted. In some other cases there can be a smaller engagement fee charged to the client, which is mostly non-refundable and typically between $300AUD-$500AUD, plus Goods and Service Tax (GST). This sort of pre-payment fee is typical in larger commercial projects.  There is no standard set fee allocated to the services of Builder Brokers to charge contractors. Typically the fees from contractors are between 3% to 5% of the total cost of the wholesale build price. It is worth noting that the larger the building broker the more significant the savings available therefore a small brokerage will have very little negotiating power on your behalf and may in fact actually cost you more.

References

External links
 Australian Competition & Consumer Commission (ACCC)
 Builder Brokers Association

Financial services occupations